Senator Wall may refer to:

Members of the United States Senate
Garret D. Wall (1783–1850), U.S. Senator from New Jersey from 1835 to 1841
James Walter Wall (1820–1872), U.S. Senator from New Jersey in 1863

United States state senate members
Hampton W. Wall (1831–1898), Illinois State Senate
Harry Wall (politician) (1894–?), Washington State Senate
Thomas Wall (politician) (1840–?), Wisconsin State Senate

See also
Josiah T. Walls (1842–1905), Florida State Senate